John or Johnny Romano may refer to:

 Johnny Romano (1934–2019), American baseball player
 John Romano (physician) (1908–1994), American physician and psychiatrist
 John Romano (writer) (born 1948), screenwriter and producer